Nkhotakota (Un-kho-tah-kho-tuh) (formerly Kota Kota) (name derived from the Chichewa for "Corner Corner") is a town and one of the districts in the Central Region of Malawi. It is on the shore of Lake Malawi (formerly Lake Nyasa) and is one of the main ports on Lake Malawi. As of 2018, Nkhotakota had a population estimated at 28,350. The district had a population of 301.000.

History

Nkhotakota was originally a group of villages in the 19th century which later served as a market for Swahili-Arabian slave traders. David Livingstone convinced Chief Jumbe to stop trading slaves under a tree in Nkhotakota in the 19th century, which is currently in existence under a mission. Later Malawi president Hastings Banda gave speeches under another tree in Nkhotakota during the 1960s, this one ironically known as the Livingstone Tree. This town was hit by the 2001 floods, and was the worst hit area of Malawi's Central region. Today, Nkhotakota is the largest traditional African town in Malawi and bears a strong Swahili-Arab influence.

Geography

It is located on a rocky ridge overlooking a natural harbour overlooking Nkhotakota Bay, formed by a sandbar.

Wildlife
Nkhotakota is home to the Nkhotakota Wildlife Reserve, where, according to Lonely Planet, one has a good chance of seeing elephants. The reserve is also home to several antelope species, buffalo, and leopards. Several large rivers cross this reserve, the largest in Malawi.

Economy
The biggest formal 'private' employer in the districts is a sugar manufacturing company "Dwangwa Sugar corporation" (currently under Illovo). Most Locals are small holder farmers of Rice, Cassava and maize, while many others are small scale fishermen, who regularly fish along Lake Malawi, Chia Lagoon and many other rivers including Bua, Dwangwa, Dwambazi and Chilua, using triangular nets on poles, hooks, etc.

Another notable antiquity (tourist attraction) in Nkhotakota is the Mawira hot springs, an area of about 3km2 of hot water that continuously gushes from the ground since time immemorial. Mawira hot springs is situated at the central area of the district, 5 km + – from the Ntchisi/Kasungu road junction.
Sungu Island (made of sand and rocks) is another fascinating place to visit in Nkhotakota central. This Island is situated inside the Lake Malawi, 1.5 km from the shores, and approximately 2 km from Kaliba station (dock), where passenger boats cruising along the lake Malawi picks or drops passengers and small scale traders.

Climate

Demographics

Population development

Languages
Chichewa is the main language spoken in this town. A Swahili settlement was also established in Nkhotakota. Several Chewa speakers live to the south of Nkhotakota, and Tonga is spoken in its north.

Facilities

Medical
There are two hospitals in Nkhotakota: Nkhotakota District Hospital and St. Anne's Mission Hospital. However, in the whole district there are 23 health facilities including 1 district hospital, 1 mission hospital, 1 government rural hospital, 1 mission rural hospital, 11 health centres, 10 private clinics and 2 dispensaries. In its efforts in the fight against HIV/AIDS, the Society for Women Against AIDS in Malawi (SWAM) implemented a two-year project in Nkhotakota.
Nkhotakota is also a regional hub for the [World Medical Fund] – a UK-based medical charity, whose rural outreach services provide the region's villages with basic medical care including anti-retrovirals, anti-malarial treatment and infectious disease management.

Banks
Branches of the First Discount House FDH Bank and NBS Bank are closely located at the central point of the town, on the junction of Salima/Lilongwe and Ntchisi/Kasungu. While Standard Bank (a branch of Standard Bank South Africa) is situated 50 km away at Illovo sugar company's premises in Dwangwa, where National Bank of Malawi and NBS Bank are situated. 
These commercial Banks provide several banking and other financial services including; foreign currency exchange facilities for local residents and foreign tourists.

Petrol stations
There are three stations, SIMSO Oil, Mount Meru petroleum and GAM at Nkhotakota Boma and others at Dwangwa and Mkaika.

Transport
Nkhotakota is one of the main ports on Lake Malawi, and it is served by the ferry MV Ilala that weekly crosses Lake Malawi. Buses run from Salima for two hours daily. In addition, minibuses run from here to Nkhata Bay along the main road which connects these towns.

References 

Lake Malawi
Populated places in Central Region, Malawi